Cveto Pavčič (born 15 April 1933) is a Slovenian cross-country skier. He competed at the 1956 Winter Olympics and the 1964 Winter Olympics.

References

1933 births
Living people
Slovenian male cross-country skiers
Olympic cross-country skiers of Yugoslavia
Cross-country skiers at the 1956 Winter Olympics
Cross-country skiers at the 1964 Winter Olympics